Pskovsky Uyezd (Псковский уезд) was one of the subdivisions of the Pskov Governorate of the Russian Empire. It was situated in the northwestern part of the governorate. Its administrative centre was Pskov.

Demographics
At the time of the Russian Empire Census of 1897, Pskovsky Uyezd had a population of 103,300. Of these, 87.5% spoke Russian, 7.8% Estonian, 1.7% Latvian, 0.9% Polish, 0.9% German, 0.7% Yiddish, 0.3% Finnish, 0.1% Romani and 0.1% Belarusian as their native language.

References

 
Uezds of Pskov Governorate
Pskov Governorate